The Anif declaration was issued by Ludwig III, King of Bavaria, on 12 November 1918 at Anif Palace, Austria.

It was a declaration in which the monarch relieved all civil servants and military personnel from their oath of loyalty to him and ended the 738-year rule of the House of Wittelsbach in Bavaria.

Historical background
With the imminent collapse of the German Empire at the end of the First World War in November 1918, the Kingdom of Bavaria, like all other states of the Empire, was in a state of transition from monarchy to republic.

Max von Speidel, Minister of War in the Bavarian government, under orders from Kurt Eisner, tried to persuade King Ludwig on 10 November (the day before the Armistice) to issue a declaration in which he would release all officers of the Bavarian Army of their oath. Speidel however arrived at the King's residence at Schloss Wildenwart, near Rosenheim, after Ludwig had already left for Austria.

Ludwig III decided to leave Bavaria temporarily for Austria, and, following an invitation of Ernst Graf von Moy, decided to take up residence at Anif Palace, near Salzburg. There, he ordered Otto Ritter von Dandl, the last prime minister of the Kingdom of Bavaria, to issue a declaration. Dandl demanded an abdication but the King was only willing to issue a statement absolving all officers, soldiers and government officials of the Kingdom of their oath. With this, the Anif declaration, Dandl returned to the Bavarian capital, Munich.

The declaration
The original document of the declaration has been lost. It was in the possession of the then interior minister of Bavaria, Erhard Auer, but was lost during the Hitler Putsch in 1923. Only typed copies exist now, bearing handwritten additions by Kurt Eisner.

Publication
Dandl returned to Munich the same day and the government under Eisner published the declaration as the abdication of Ludwig III. While some, even conservative politicians, shared the government's interpretation of the declaration as an abdication, others pointed out the discrepancy between its wording and its use by the government as a declaration of abdication.

Kurt Eisner had the declaration published word by word with his own below it. In his addition he states that the People's State of Bavaria accepts the abdication of King Ludwig III and assures him and his family that they are free to return to Bavaria, like every other citizen, providing they take no steps against the people's state.

After the death of Ludwig III in 1921, his son, Rupprecht, Crown Prince of Bavaria, asserted his rights to the Bavarian crown, claiming it to be his birthright to be King of Bavaria unless the people decided on a different form of government after free elections. Until his death in 1955, Rupprecht continued to demand that the question of whether Bavaria would be a republic or a monarchy should be decided by a constituent assembly chosen in a democratic election.

References

External links
 History of war: Crown Prince Rupprecht of Bavaria, 1869-1955
 Historisches Lexikon Bayerns - Anifer Erklärung, 12./13. November 1918 (in German)

Monarchy in Germany
20th century in Bavaria
House of Wittelsbach
1918 in Germany
German Revolution of 1918–1919
1918 documents